Nauru is a small island nation in Oceania.

History
Homosexuality was criminalised in 1899, when the island was a German protectorate. Sodomy laws were again introduced in 1921 when the island was under Australian rule and are based on the Criminal Code of Queensland. Those laws were retained following Nauruan independence in 1968.

In January 2011, Mathew Batsiua, Minister for Health, Justice and Sports, stated that the decriminalisation of "homosexual activity between consenting adults" was "under active consideration". In October 2011, the government pledged to decriminalize same-sex sexual acts; however, no relevant legislation was enacted by the end of 2014.

On 27 May 2016, Nauru decriminalised homosexuality.

See also
 LGBT movements
 LGBT rights by country or territory
 LGBT rights in Nauru

References

LGBT in Nauru
Nauru
History of Nauru